It's Christmas is the first studio Christmas album from Australian worship band Planetshakers. Planetshakers Ministries International and Venture3Media released the album on 29 November 2019. This album includes the Christmas releases of EPs Christmas Vol. 1 (2017) and Christmas Vol. 2 (2018).

Critical reception

Awarding the album four stars at CCM Magazine, Jaime Vaughn states, "The title track 'It’s Christmas' is a festive pop sound that will help you get right into the Christmas spirit with lyrics 'Can you feel it in the air / Joy is everywhere, it’s Christmas / Everything is shining bright / Oh what a glorious night, it’s Christmas.' This album also blends in a beautiful jazz ballad of 'All Glory' to bring your heart to reflect on the true meaning of Christmas. This album gives the entire family a song to fall in love with no matter what their favorite musical genre may be."
Rating the album 6.9 stars by One Man In The Middle, Rob Allwright states, "Other than these tracks you will find a couple of other original tracks from the band on the album previously featured. I do think that this is an album that is trying hard to be everything for people and I know we don't live in little boxes for our musical tastes. There are some great tracks here and if you don't own either of the previous EPs then this is worth picking up."

Track listing

Personnel
Adapted from AllMusic.

 Planetshakers – Primary artist
 Joth Hunt – Arranger, chant, composer, guitars, keyboards, mixing, producer, programming, vocals
 Samantha Evans – Worship leader, vocals, executive producer
 Rudy Nikkerud – Vocals
 Chelsi Nikkerud – Vocals
 Steve Sowden – Vocals
 Natalie Ruiz – Vocals
 Joe Vatucicila – Vocals
 Rachel Vatucicila – Vocals
 Kemara Fuimaono – Vocals
 Andy Harrison – Vocals, drums
 Josh Ham – Bass
 Joe Carra – Mastering
 Joshua Brown	– A&R, Artist development
 Daryl Chia	– Artwork 
 Rachel McCarthy – Artwork
 John F. Wade – Arranger, composer
 Russell Evans – Worship Leader, executive producer
 Steve Nicolle – Executive producer

It's Christmas Live

It's Christmas Live is Planetshakers' first live Christmas album. Planetshakers Ministries International and Venture3Media released the album on 27 November 2020. This live album is the studio version It's Christmas was released last year. This album was recorded live in front of a packed auditorium at Planetshakers Church before the pandemic lockdowns, the full production recording and companion video was produced, directed and mixed by Joth Hunt at Planetshakers Studios. The album is led by Hunt and worship leaders Rudy Nikkerud, Chelsi Nikkerud, Natalie Ruiz, Joe Vatucicila, Rachel Vatucicila, Kemara Fuimaono and Steve Sowden. The recording also features a 59-voice choir and multiple drum, guitar, bass and keyboard musicians.

Track listing

Personnel
Adapted from AllMusic.

 Adolphe Adam	– Arranger, Composer
 Tabetha Aguilera	– Choir/Chorus
 Ibrahim Ahmed – Drums
 Brendan Allen	– Stage Manager
 Josiah Ang – Choir/Chorus
 Elizabeth Arcangel – Choir/Chorus
 San Awng – Choir/Chorus
 Melissa Bell – Monitors
 Angela Bermudez – Choir/Chorus
 Jennifer Bourke – Project Coordinator
 Joshua Brown – A&R, Artist Development
 Joe Carra	– Mastering
 Olivia Chambers – Stage Design
 Alan Chan	– Choir/Chorus
 Stella Chandra – Choir/Chorus
 Brian Cheng – Camera Assistant
 Nicole Chew – Camera Assistant
 Christel Chia – Camera Operator, Editing, Graphics
 Daryl Chia – Artwork, Camera Operator, Design, Editing, Graphics
 Nicole Harsono Chia – Choir/Chorus
 Desmond Chong	– Stage Design
 Nikita Christopher – Choir/Chorus
 Moses Chuas – Stage Design
 Selina Chuo – Choir/Chorus
 Lucas Clayton	– Stage Design
 Josh Creek – Stage Design
 Ellen Desear – Choir/Chorus
 John S. Dwight – Arranger, Composer
 Mohammad Eakhrzadeh – Stage Design
 Micaela Elliott – Camera Operator, Editing, Graphics
 Jono Evans – Drums
 Russell Evans	– Executive Producer
 Sam Evans	– Composer, Executive Producer
 Justus Field – Choir/Chorus
 Felix Filbert	– Choir/Chorus
 Feilicia Fiona – Choir/Chorus
 Crystal Forrester	– Choir/Chorus
 David Foster – Arranger, Composer
 Kemara Fuimaono – Vocals
 Sandhi Garcia	– Stage Design
 Corey Glazebrook – Choir/Chorus
 Rhema Goruck – Choir/Chorus
 Carol Ham	– Stage Design
 Josh Ham – Bass
 Aaron Hammill	– Choir/Chorus
 Alanna Hammill – Choir/Chorus
 Andy Harrison	– Drums
 Alyssa Heilborn – Stage Design
 Alvin Hiew – Assistant, Stage Design
 Esther Hkawn – Choir/Chorus
 Ben Hogarth – Stage Design
 Florence Huang – Stage Design
 Joth Hunt	– Adaptation, Arranger, Artwork, Composer, Design, Mixing, Producer, Project Coordinator, Video Director, Vocals
 Racheal Hunt – Choir/Chorus
 Precious Mae Hurtado – Choir/Chorus
 Lorna Kakono – Choir/Chorus
 Megan Kappelhoff – Choir/Chorus
 Jansen Karim – Choir/Chorus
 Terry Kay	– Monitor Engineer
 Zach Kellock – Assistant Engineer
 Angie Kim	– Monitors, Stage Design
 Ejuen Lee	– Choir/Chorus
 Ernest Lew – Photography
 Hannah Limsiaco – Choir/Chorus
 Ada Liu – Stage Design
 Faith Lo – Assistant, Stage Design
 William Loo – Stage Design
 Sherlyn Marvella – Stage Design
 Bryan Mason – Choir/Chorus
 Priscilla Mery – Choir/Chorus
 Sophie Mildenhall	– Choir/Chorus
 Selina Mok – Guitar (Acoustic)
 Sharon Monk – Choir/Chorus
 Lupiya Mujala	– Stage Design
 Hannah Myszka	– Choir/Chorus
 Anotidaishe Naomi	– Choir/Chorus
 Neil Castro – Choir/Chorus
 Steph Ng – Stage Design
 Steve Nicolle – Executive Producer
 Rudy Nikkerud – Vocals
 Chelsi Nikkerud – Vocals
 Jack Norris – Choir/Chorus
 Shona Oavey – Choir/Chorus
 Maila Ocampo-Reyes – Choir/Chorus
 Fadi Odeesh – Choir/Chorus
 Janelle Oh – Choir/Chorus
 Terence Ong – Engineer, Live Recording, Production Manager
 Christian John Phillips – Camera Operator
 Remah Picimi	– Choir/Chorus
 Dave Pike	– Lighting
 Mike Pilmer – Camera Operator
 Planetshakers	– Primary Artist
 Sheridan Pover – Choir/Chorus
 Sarah Rayners	– Choir/Chorus
 Tony Renis – Arranger, Composer
 Javiera Rivas	– Choir/Chorus
 Natalie Ruiz	– Vocals
 Carole Bayer Sager – Arranger, Composer
 Ben Salvador – Bass
 Lorraine Salvador	– Choir/Chorus
 Elysabeth Santoso	– Choir/Chorus
 Anabella Secchiaro – Choir/Chorus
 Virtuous Selere – Choir/Chorus
 Felicity Shalless	– Stage Design
 Belinda Simmons – Choir/Chorus
 Ryan Smith – Camera Operator, Editing, Graphics
 Lloyd Smyth – Keyboards
 Justin Soh – Photography
 Steve Sowden	– Vocals
 Rachel Sparkes –Choir/Chorus
 Zach Spinks – Assistant Engineer
 Brandon Stafford – Choir/Chorus
 Kh Tah – Guitar (Acoustic), Guitars
 Sarah-Joy Tan	– Choir/Chorus
 Zoe Tang - Choir/Chorus
 Alberto Testa	– Arranger, Composer
 Will Thomas – Stage Design
 Caroline Tjung – Choir/Chorus
 Traditional – Composer
 Ashley Turner	– Choir/Chorus
 Joe Vatucicila – Vocals
 Rachel Vatucicila	– Arranger, Vocals
 Marce Vega – Choir/Chorus
 John F. Wade – Arranger, Composer
 Isaac Watts – Composer
 Michael Wendt – Camera Operator
 Bellivia Wijaya – Choir/Chorus
 Julian Williams – Lighting Assistant
 Matt Wong	– Production Design, Production Manager, Technical Director
 Wei Xiong Yap	– Photography
 Sue Lynn Grace Yee – Choir/Chorus
 Vinnie Yeoh – Choir/Chorus
 Jonathan Yew-Cheong – Choir/Chorus
 Lok Yuong Yong – Stage Design
 Isaac Younan – Choir/Chorus

References

2019 Christmas albums
Christmas albums by Australian artists
2020 Christmas albums
Planetshakers albums